A Reverie for Mister Ray: Reflections on Life, Death, and Speculative Fiction is a collection of nonfiction work by American writer Michael Bishop published in 2005 by PS Publishing. It includes essays and reviews from 1975 to 2004, originally published in a wide variety of newspapers, magazines, literary journals, and fanzines. Most of the pieces concern the speculative fiction genre.  The book was edited by Michael H. Hutchins.

Contents

Upfront 
 A Reverie for Mister Mike: An Introduction by Jeff VanderMeer
 Alien Graffiti: Author’s Apologia by Michael Bishop
 On the Road: Editor’s Preface by Michael H. Hutchins

Drawing from the Wells 
 A Reverie for Mister Ray [1981]
 A Classic Affair [1990]
 "An Art Is Something You Have to Learn”: RIP Clifton Fadiman [1999]
 Little, Big, Witless, Wise: Gulliver’s Travels by Jonathan Swift [2004]
 Flannery and Me [2001]
 More Than a Masterpiece? More Than Human by Theodore Sturgeon [1989]
 A Classic’s Endearing Quirks: The Left Hand of Darkness by Ursula K. Le Guin [1977]

State of the Art 
 Evangels of Hope [1978]
 Believers and Heretics: An Episcopal Bull [1980]
 The Knack and How to Get It, See? [1978]
 The Contributors to Plenum Four [1975]
 Light Years and Dark: Science Fiction Since 1960 [1984]
 Children Who Survive: An Autobiographical Meditation on Horror Fiction [1989]
 104 Really Cool Works of Twentieth-Century Fiction in English [2000]

On Reviewing 
 Oh, to Be a Blurber! [1980]
 On Reviewing and Being Reviewed [1977]
 Critics’ Night at the Sci-Fi Bistro [1979]

Pitching Pennies Against the Starboard Bulkhead 
 The Fifth Head of Cerberus by Gene Wolfe [1976]
 Timescape by Gregory Benford [1980]
 Wild Seed by Octavia Butler [1981]
 Myths of the Near Future by J. G. Ballard [1984]
 Two by John Crowley: Little, Big [1983] and Antiquities: Seven Stories [1994]
 Speaker for the Dead by Orson Scott Card [1987]
 The Toynbee Convector by Ray Bradbury [1988]
 Kim Stanley Robinson’s Mars Trilogy [1993/94/96]
 Nightfishing in Great Sky River by David Lunde [2000]
 The Wooden Sea by Jonathan Carroll [2001]
 He Do the Time Police in Different Voices by David Langford [2004]
 The Untethered Spacewalk by NASA [1984]

Going Deeper 
 In Pursuit of Ubik: A Novel by Philip K. Dick [1979]
 Gene Wolfe as Hero: The Shadow of the Torturer [1980]
 Only in America: On Wings of Song by Thomas M. Disch [1981]
 James Morrow and Towing Jehovah [1994]
 James Morrow’s Antidote X: Speculative Satire and The Eternal Footman [2000]
 The Education of Brian W. Aldiss: The Twinkling of an Eye, or, My Life as an Englishman [1999]
 “Sitting in the Sun in the Waist-High Grass”: “The Last Day in July” by Gardner Dozois [2001]
 In Praise of Hollyhocks: “The Aliens Who Knew, I Mean, Everything” by George Alec Effinger [2004]

Fellow Travelers 
 A Speculation of SF Writers: Gardner Dozois / Suzette Haden Elgin / Steven Utley / Ian Watson [1980]
 All That Glitters is Not Golding . . . Or Bishop Either [1984/85]
 James Tiptree, Jr. is Raccoona Sheldon is Alice B. Sheldon is Alli is… [1985/92]
 Saluting Pamela Sargent [1987]
 The Once and Future Andy Duncan [2000]
 Voice and Virtue: Celebrating Jack McDevitt [2003]

Rolling the Bones 
 Ink and Inspiration Among the Soft Sciences [1981]
 Lucy in the Mud With Footprints: Lucy: The Beginnings of Humankind by Donald C. Johanson and Maitland A. Edey [1981]
 The Boy in the Bush: Lightning Bird by Lyall Watson [1982]
 Mysteries of the Rift Valley: One Life by Richard E. Leakey and Disclosing the Past by Mary Leakey [1984]
 The Fate of the Primate: The Deluge and the Ark: A Journey Into Primate Worlds by Dale Peterson [1989]
 Prospectus for a Novel of Human Prehistory, or The Origins of No Enemy But Time [1982]

Edge Running 
 Primates in Love: The Female of the Species by Lionel Shriver [1987]
 Geniuses in One Another’s Pockets: Neighboring Lives by Thomas M. Disch and Charles Naylor [1981]
 Two by J. G. Ballard: Empire of the Sun and The Day of Creation [1984/1988]
 Two by Philip K. Dick: In Milton Lumky Territory and The Man Whose Teeth Were All Exactly Alike [1985]
 A Jeremiad, Three Reviews and a Postscript: Death is a Lonely Business by Ray Bradbury / Galápagos by Kurt Vonnegut / Contact by Carl Sagan [1985]
 Inconvenient Invitations: Mister Touch by Malcolm Bosse / Brazzaville Beach by William Boyd [1991]
 Watching the Elephant Vanish: The Elephant Vanishes by Haruki Murakami [1994]
 A Near-Future Southern, An Off-Trail Western: Land O’ Goshen by Charles McNair and Redeye by Clyde Edgerton [1995]
 A Larger Sky: The Norton Book of Ghost Stories edited by Brad Leithauser / Seaward by Brad Leithauser [1995]
 An American Wordsmith in Atlantis: Atlantis: Three Tales by Samuel R. Delany [1996]
 Touring the Republic of Pain: Ingenious Pain by Andrew Miller [1998]
 Encounter of a Wee Kind [1978]

Open Heart 
 Military Brat: A Memoir [1997]
 First Novel, Seventh Novel: A Funeral for the Eyes of Fire [1988]
 My Private Civil War: Preface to Confederacy of the Dead [1993]
 Three Tributes: Paul Di Filippo / David Hartwell / Howard Waldrop [2001-2003]
 Cleansing the Eye of the Heart: A Dream of the Tattered Man by Randolph Loney [2001]
 Ghost of a Chance: My Father’s Ghost by Suzy McKee Charnas [2003]
 Nine Prescriptions for My Funeral [1997]
 Writing Science Fiction As If It Mattered (including “Tiny Bells” by Bruce Holland Rogers) [2002]

External links 
 Michael Bishop's official homepage
  Infinity Plus review of A Reverie for Mister Ray
 Publisher’s page
 The Alien Online article and interview

Essay collections
2005 non-fiction books
PS Publishing books